Yangon International Airport  is the primary and busiest international airport of Myanmar. All ten Myanmar carriers and about 30 international airlines operate at Yangon International Airport. The airport is also colloquially known as Mingaladon Airport due to its location.

History
During World War II, the airfield was called RAF Mingaladon and served as an operating base for fighter aircraft such as:
No. 60 Squadron RAF from February 1941 to February 1942 flying Bristol Blenheim I
No. 67 Squadron RAF from October 1941 to March 1942 flying Brewster F2A Buffalo and Hawker Hurricane IIs
No. 135 Squadron RAF from January–February 1942 flying Hawker Hurricane IIs
No. 681 Squadron RAF from June to September 1945 flying Supermarine Spitfire
3rd Squadron of 1st American Volunteer Group (Flying Tigers) of the Chinese Air Force flying Curtiss P-40s

There was also a Communication Flight of the Burma Volunteer Air Force equipped with Tiger Moths and Westland Lysanders and anti-aircraft support for the airfield was provided by members of the 12th Burma Rifles.

Mingaladon was then used by the Japanese, and Japanese bombers based in Bangkok were moved forward to Mingaladon when there was a full moon. The British at the Wireless Experimental Centre in Delhi were breaking BULBUL the IJA air-to-ground code, and could predict Japanese air raids. On one occasion Allied nightfighters "got the lot and all night we could hear Mingaladon air base calling for its lost children".

Additional units;

 Air Headquarters Burma Communication Squadron RAF
 Air Headquarters Burma Communication Flight RAF
 Air Headquarters Netherlands East Indies Communication Squadron RAF
 No. 221 Group Communication Squadron RAF

After World War II, Yangon Airport was built on the former RAF Mingaladon in 1947 by the Calcutta Metropolitan Airports Authority. Once regarded as the best in Southeast Asia and the primary airport serving that region, the airport fell into disrepair and remained that way for decades, as new superhubs like Singapore Changi Airport, Kuala Lumpur Sepang, Bangkok Suvarnabhumi and Jakarta Soekarno-Hatta were built and superseded Yangon's facilities.

Airport capacity was boosted to 6 million passengers per year in early 2016. Currently, there are plans to build a completely new and larger airport, Hanthawaddy International Airport, on a much larger site and somewhat away from Yangon.

Modernization

A modernization program was launched in April 2003 and resulted in a new terminal and an extended 3414 m runway.

Designed by the Airport Development Division of CPG Corporation of Singapore, a new terminal was constructed at a cost of US$13.3 million by Asia World. It can handle 900 arriving and 900 departing passengers simultaneously. The design meets IATA service standards and complies with ICAO safety and security standards at a cost of SG$30 million. Other notable features include:
 Separate floors for arriving and departing passengers to lessen congestion
 Automated baggage handling system with an integrated check-in system
 Four air bridges, capable of handling four Boeing 747s
 Special lounges for use by government officials and business people
 A two-story parking garage with spaces for 340 vehicles

In June 2011, the government announced plans to expand the airport by 40% and increase its capacity from 2.7 million passengers to 3.8 million passengers annually. The airport was already over its annual capacity of 2.7 million passengers, having accepted 3.1 million in 2012 and 4 million in 2014. To fulfill this increased demand, new international and domestic terminals are being constructed and are expected to be finished end of 2016. After upgrading, Yangon International Airport will be able to service 6 million passengers annually.

In 2013, a contract worth $150 million was awarded to a consortium led by an affiliate of Asia World to construct a new domestic terminal and expansion of airport apron.

The new international terminal (T1) opened in March 2016, with the previously existing international terminal being designated as T2. The new domestic terminal (T3) opened on 5 December 2016.

Terminals

Terminal 1 

In August 2014, the old domestic terminal was demolished and construction began for the new six-story Terminal 1 which will handle international flights. The opening ceremony was held on 12 March 2016. After the opening of Terminal 1, the airport can handle 6 million passengers annually, as opposed to 2.7 million before.

Terminal 2 

After the opening of Terminal 1, the former International Terminal was renamed "Terminal 2." The building was designed by the CPG Corporation of Singapore and constructed by the Asia World Company costing US$13.3million. The terminal can handle 900 arriving passengers and 900 departing passengers at the same time.
Terminal 2 was closed in July 2018 to undergo extensive renovation. All international flights now operate from Terminal 1.

Terminal 3 

Terminal 3, which is used for domestic flights, opened on 5 December 2016, replacing the old domestic terminal which was demolished in August 2014.

Guard of Honour Building (VIP Terminal) 
The former VIP terminal was temporarily used as the domestic terminal until Terminal 3 was completed. The Guard of Honour Building has been demolished to make way for a connector between Terminals 1 and 2.

Airlines and destinations

Passenger

Statistics

Top destinations

Traffic by calendar year

Accidents and incidents
 On 25 March 1978, Fokker F-27 Friendship 200 XY-ADK lost height and crashed into a paddy field just after takeoff from Mingaladon Airport, killing all 48 people on board.
 On 27 January 1998, a Myanma Airways Fokker F27 crashed while taking off from Yangon, Myanmar, killing 16 of the 45 people on board.
On 29 January 2017, U Ko Ni, a constitutional lawyer and advisor to Aung San Suu Kyi was assassinated outside of Gate 6.
 On 8 May 2019, Biman Bangladesh Airlines Flight 60, operating the Dhaka-Yangon route by Bombardier Dash-8 Q400, skidded off the runway while landing. Nobody was injured critically. The 33 people, including the pilot, co-pilot and the passengers, suffered minor injuries.
 On 2 August 2019 a Golden Myanmar Airlines Y5-506 ATR-72-600 departed from Mandalay to Yangon airport, and the landing gear of nose wheel broke when it landed on the runway of Yangon International Airport. No significant damage or injuries were reported in the incident.

Airport shuttle bus 

The Yangon Bus Service (YBS) provides airport shuttle bus line that stop at 13 bus stops between Yangon International Airport and Yangon Central Railway Station. The buses make stops at Yangon International Airport, 8 Mile, Nawade, Kaba-Aye Pagoda, Lanni, Hanmithit, Shwegondine, Bahan 3rd Street, Kyauktaing, Yauklan and Sule Pagoda. Stops on the return journey include Sule, Yangon Railway Station, Zoological Gardens, Bahan 3rd Street, Shwegondine, Lanni, Kaba-Aye Pagoda, Nawade, 8 Mile and the airport. The fare is 500 kyats (approximately 50 U.S. cents).

Gallery

See also

References

Citations

Bibliography

External links 
 
 Yangon International Airport
 Yangon International Airport Facebook

Airports in Myanmar
Buildings and structures in Yangon
Transport in Yangon